Gali Baharav-Miara (Hebrew: גלי בהרב-מיארה; born 18 September 1959) is an Israeli lawyer who serves as the current Attorney General of Israel. Prior to that, she served as the Tel Aviv District Attorney for Civil Affairs, and as a consultant to the law firm Tadmor & Co. She is the first female Attorney General of Israel.

Biography
She was born to Shulamit (nee Davidovich), a painter, and to Emanuel Baharav, who served in the Palmach and fought in the 1947–1949 Palestine war. She holds a bachelor's degree (1984, with honors) and a master's degree (1990) in law from Tel Aviv University, where she served as a teaching assistant and adjunct professor.

In 1985, she joined the Tel Aviv District Attorney's Office, where she served for about thirty years in a variety of positions, mainly in the fields of civil and administrative law. In 2002, she was appointed director of the administrative department of the District Attorney's Office, and between 2007 and 2015 she served as Tel Aviv District Attorney for Civil Affairs. In tort cases filed by Palestinians living in the Occupied Territories against the state, she has led a policy of opposition to the lawsuits. In 2014, she was one of candidates for the position of Director General of the Ministry of Justice, but eventually was not chosen for the position.

After retiring from the State Attorney's Office
After retiring from the State Attorney's Office, she joined the law firm Tadmor & Co. as a consultant.

Since 2015, she has been a member of the Civil Service Commission's search committee, giving her opinion to the government on senior appointments whose appointments require government approval. She also served as a member of the Advisory Committee for the Administrative Courts Law and the Advisory Committee on Civil Procedure, chaired the Committee for the Examination of Appointments in Municipal Corporations in the Ministry of the Interior, chaired the Public Committee for the Examination of Private Investigations, and a member of the Administrative Courts Council.

In 2018, at the request of the State Attorney's Office, she wrote an opinion defending Benny Gantz and Amir Eshel from a tort lawsuit filed in a Dutch court by a Palestinian whose family members were killed in 2014 Gaza War. Her opinion was accepted and the claim was dismissed. In May 2019, along with former senior members of the State Attorney's Office and the office of the Attorney General of Israel, she signed a statement against initiatives to grant the Knesset an override of the Supreme Court and the extension of the Immunity Law.

Attorney General of Israel 
In November 2021, Baharav-Miara was announced by Justice Minister Gideon Saar as one of the three candidates for the position of Attorney General, and was considered his preferred candidate. Her candidacy was also supported by Prime Minister Naftali Bennett. On February 7, 2022, the Government unanimously approved her appointment. Baharav-Miara is the first woman to serve in that position.

Private life
Baharav-Miara is married to Tzion Miara, who served in senior positions in the security services. In 2002 he was diagnosed with ALS and has been coping with the disease ever since. The couple has three sons  and lives in Givatayim.

References

Israeli lawyers
Tel Aviv University alumni
Attorneys General of Israel
1959 births
Living people